John England & the Western Swingers is a six piece Nashville, Tennessee band that plays Western swing. The group has played at Nashville's Robert's Western World every Monday since July 2001. The Swingers have also performed at New York's Lincoln Center, the Grand Ole Opry, the Legends of Western Swing Festival, the Ernest Tubb Record Shop's "Midnight Jamboree", and has been profiled by Downbeat magazine, the Nashville Tennessean, and other print media.

Members
The band's lineup is:
John England (gtr, vocals)
Gene "Pappy" Merritts (fiddle, vocals)
Tommy Hannum(steel, vocals)
David Spicher(bass, vocals)
Walter Hartman (drums)
Neil Stretcher (piano, vocals)

Earlier members of the group include Randy Mason (drums & vocals, 2002–2004) and Tom McBryde (piano, 2002–2005)

Discography
The group's 4 albums are: Swinging Broadway (2002), Thanks a Lot (2004), Open that Gate (2008), and Songs Older than Pappy (2013).  Swinging Broadway established the group's stylistic identity, i.e. Bob Wills type Western Swing with ensembles of guitar, fiddle and steel.  Thanks a Lot contains Western Swing versions of songs popularized by Ernest Tubb.  Open that Gate emphasizes the group's original songs. Songs Older than Pappy is a collection of Americana standards & some originals.[1]

References
[1]Terre Haute Tribune Star, August 1, 2013

External links
John England & the Western Swingers

Musical groups from Nashville, Tennessee
Western swing musical groups